Anthony Ambrose Richardson (28 June 1925 – 17 December 1999) was an Australian rules footballer who played with St Kilda in the Victorian Football League (VFL).

Notes

External links 

1925 births
1999 deaths
Australian rules footballers from Victoria (Australia)
St Kilda Football Club players
Oakleigh Football Club players